The 1995 Hong Kong Urban Council and Regional Council elections were the municipal elections held on 5 March 1995 for the elected seats of the Urban Council and Regional Council respectively. It was the second of the three-tier elections held in 1995 under Governor Chris Patten's electoral reform, namely the 1994 District Board and 1995 Legislative Council election. The liberal Democratic Party continued its dominance by winning 23 seats in total. Due to the abolishment of the two Councils by Chief Executive Tung Chee-hwa in 1999, this election became the last election.

Overview
Due to the democratisation reform under the governorship of Chris Patten, all the appointed seats since the creations of the Councils were replaced by members of direct elections. 32 seats in the Urban Council was the directly elected by the general residents and 9 seats were elected by the Hong Kong Island and Kowloon District Boards members. For Regional Council, 27 seats were directly elected and 9 seats were elected by the New Territories District Boards members, with 3 ex-officio members of the Chairman and two chairmen of the Heung Yee Kuk. The first-past-the-post voting system was used.

Dozens of long-serving Urban and Regional Councillors decided not to stand in the first full-scale municipal-level elections. The most senior member on the Urban Council Brook Bernacchi who was first elected in 1952 would not stand because the council was becoming increasingly politicised. Elsie Tu, the second most senior Councillor was challenged and defeated by the Democratic Party heavyweight Szeto Wah for the Kwun Tong North seat.

As a result, 21 Urban Councillors left in 1995 taking with them a total of 210 years of experience.

After the transfer of sovereignty to the People's Republic of China, Chief Executive Tung Chee-hwa decided to streamline and centralise municipal services as part of his government's policy reforms by dissolving the two Councils. The 1995 election thus became the last election.

General results

|-
!style="background-color:#E9E9E9;text-align:center;" colspan=3 rowspan=2|Political Affiliation 
!style="background-color:#E9E9E9;text-align:center;" colspan=3 |Urban Council
!style="background-color:#E9E9E9;text-align:center;" colspan=3 |Regional Council
!style="background-color:#E9E9E9;text-align:center;" colspan=3 |Total
|-
! style="background-color:#E9E9E9;text-align:center;" |Popularvotes
! style="background-color:#E9E9E9;text-align:center;" |Standing
! style="background-color:#E9E9E9;text-align:center;" |Elected
! style="background-color:#E9E9E9;text-align:center;" |Popularvotes
! style="background-color:#E9E9E9;text-align:center;" |Standing
! style="background-color:#E9E9E9;text-align:center;" |Elected
! style="background-color:#E9E9E9;text-align:center;" |Popularvotes
! style="background-color:#E9E9E9;text-align:center;" |%
! style="background-color:#E9E9E9;text-align:center;" |Totalseatsgained
|-
| style="background-color:LightGreen;border-bottom-style:hidden;" rowspan=6 | 
|style="background-color:" |
| style="text-align:left;" |Democratic Party || 108,182 || 19 || 12 || 97,641 || 17 || 11 || 205,823 || 36.91 || 23
|-
|style="background-color:" |
| style="text-align:left;" |Hong Kong Association for Democracy and People's Livelihood || 13,822 || 5 || 5 || 25,096 || 4 || 3 || 38,918 || 6.98 || 8
|-
|style="background-color:" |
| style="text-align:left;" |123 Democratic Alliance || 1,556 || 1 || 0 || 6,360 || 2 || 0 || 7,916 || 1.42 || 0
|-
|style="background-color:" |
| style="text-align:left;" |Hong Kong Democratic Foundation || 1,693 || 2 || 0 || - || - || - || 1,693 || 0.30 || 0
|-
|
| style="text-align:left;" | Chinese Liberal Democratic Party || 1,453 || 1 || 0 || - || - || - || 1,453 || 0.26 || 0
|-
|style="background-color:" |
| style="text-align:left;" |Pro-democracy individuals || 15,171 || 5 || 1 || 16,252 || 4 || 2 || 31,423 || 5.64 || 3
|- style="background-color:LightGreen"
| colspan=3 style="text-align:left;" | Total for pro-democracy parties and allies || 141,877 || 33 || 18 || 145,349 || 27 || 16 || 287,226 || 51.51 || 34
|-
| style="background-color:Pink;border-bottom-style:hidden;" rowspan=12 |
|style="background-color:" |
| style="text-align:left;" |Democratic Alliance for the Betterment of Hong Kong || 70,690 || 12 || 5 || 19,858 || 5 || 3 || 90,548 || 16.24 || 8
|-
|style="background-color:" |
| style="text-align:left;" |Liberal Democratic Federation of Hong Kong || 9,757 || 2 || 1 || 15,641 || 4 || 3 || 25,398 || 4.55 || 4
|-
|style="background-color:" |
| style="text-align:left;" | Civil Force || - || - || - || 10,546 || 2 || 1 || 10,546 || 1.89 || 1
|-
|style="background-color:" |
| style="text-align:left;" |Liberal Party || 3,370 || 1 || 1 || 3,818 || 2 || 0 || 7,188 || 1.29 || 1
|-
|style="background-color:" |
| style="text-align:left;" |New Hong Kong Alliance || 4,901	|| 1 || 1 || - || - || - || 4,901 || 0.88 || 1
|-
|style="background-color:#EA0001" |
| style="text-align:left;" | Hong Kong Chinese Reform Association || 3,953 || 1 || 1 || - || - || - || 3,953 || 0.71 || 1
|-
|style="background-color:" |
| style="text-align:left;" | United Front for the Service of the People || - || - || - || 8,377	|| 3 || 0 || 8,377 || 1.50 || 0
|-
|style="background-color:" |
| style="text-align:left;" |Hong Kong Progressive Alliance || 1,770	|| 1 || 0 || 3,508 || 1 || 0 || 5,278 || 0.95 || 0
|-
|style="background-color:"|
| style="text-align:left;" | Hong Kong Alliance of Chinese and Expatriates || 2,229 || 1 || 0 || - || - || - || 2,229 || 0.40 || 0
|-
|
| style="text-align:left;" | Public Affairs Society || 1,140 || 1 || 0 || - || - || - || 1,140 || 0.20 || 0
|-
|style="background-color:" |
| style="text-align:left;" |Hong Kong Civic Association || 189 || 1 || 0 || - || - || - || 189 || 0.03 || 0
|-
|style="background-color:" |
| style="text-align:left;" |Pro-Beijing Individuals || 51,088 || 17 || 4 || 50,308 || 14 || 4 || 101,396 || 18.18 || 8
|- style="background-color:Pink"
| colspan=3 style="text-align:left;" | Total for pro-Beijing and conservative parties and allies || 149,087 || 38 || 13 || 112,056 || 31 || 11 || 261,143 || 46.83 || 24
|-
|style="background-color:" |
| style="text-align:left;" colspan=2 |Non-aligned Individuals and others || 4,537 || 4 || 1 || 4,693 || 2 || 0 || 9,230 || 1.66 || 1
|-
|style="text-align:left;background-color:#E9E9E9" colspan="3"|Total
|style="text-align:right;background-color:#E9E9E9"|295,501
|style="text-align:right;background-color:#E9E9E9"|75
|style="text-align:right;background-color:#E9E9E9"|32
|style="text-align:right;background-color:#E9E9E9"|262,098
|style="text-align:right;background-color:#E9E9E9"|60
|style="text-align:right;background-color:#E9E9E9"|27
|style="text-align:right;background-color:#E9E9E9"|557,599
|style="text-align:right;background-color:#E9E9E9"|100.00
|style="text-align:right;background-color:#E9E9E9"|59
|}

Result breakdown

Urban Council

Regional Council

Citations

References
 Report on the 1995 Urban Council and Regional Council ordinary elections Hong Kong: Boundary and Election Commission, 1995.

1995 elections in Asia
1995 in Hong Kong
Urban and Regional
1995 elections in British Overseas Territories
March 1995 events in Asia